Speak is the debut album by British-American dance-pop band Londonbeat, released in 1988. It includes the singles "There's a Beat Going On" (No. 88 in the United Kingdom, No. 19 in the Netherlands, No. 35 in New Zealand), "9 A.M. (The Comfort Zone)" (UK No. 19, Netherlands No. 33) and "Failing in Love Again" (UK No. 60, Netherlands No. 11).

Track listing
All tracks written by William Henshall, Jimmy Helms, George Chandler and Jimmy Chambers.

Note
Tracks 12–14 on CD only.

Personnel
Adapted from the album's liner notes.

Musicians
Jimmy Helms, Jimmy "Chirpy" Chambers, George Chandler – vocals
Willy M (William Henshall) – all instruments
Gary James – drums (track 11)
Luís Jardim – drums (tracks 2, 9)
Michael Kamen – string arrangement on "9AM (The Comfort Zone)"
Ollie Marland – keyboards, piano (tracks 7, 11)
Doc Savage – drums
David A. Stewart – slide dobro (track 11)
John G. Turnbull – guitar solo, fuzz guitar solo (tracks 7, 11)
Paul Waller – drums (tracks 3, 8)

Production
Willy M – producer, original engineer, mixer
Ian Caple – engineer, extra track laying
Fred Defaye – engineer, extra track laying and mix engineer, string overdub engineer
Ben Fenner – mixer, mix engineer
Robert Goldstein – photography
Doc Savage – extra programming, mixer
Mark "Spike" Stent – engineer, mix engineer
Paul Waller – mixer

References

External links
Speak at Discogs

1988 debut albums
Londonbeat albums